Liudmyla Liashenko (born 17 May 1993) is a Ukrainian cross-country skier and biathlete. She has competed at the Paralympics in 2014, 2018 and 2022.

Career
Liudmyla Liashenko claimed her first Paralympic medal, bronze, in the women's 6km standing biathlon event, which was ultimately the first medal received by Ukraine at the 2018 Winter Paralympics.

She won the bronze medal in the women's 10km standing cross-country skiing event at the 2021 World Para Snow Sports Championships held in Lillehammer, Norway. She also won the gold medal in the women's long-distance standing cross-country skiing event. In biathlon, she won the silver medal in the women's 6km standing event. She also won the gold medal in the women's 10km standing biathlon event.

References

External links 
 

1993 births
Living people
Ukrainian female cross-country skiers
Ukrainian female biathletes
Biathletes at the 2014 Winter Paralympics
Cross-country skiers at the 2014 Winter Paralympics
Biathletes at the 2018 Winter Paralympics
Biathletes at the 2022 Winter Paralympics
Cross-country skiers at the 2018 Winter Paralympics
Paralympic biathletes of Ukraine
Paralympic cross-country skiers of Ukraine
Paralympic gold medalists for Ukraine
Paralympic silver medalists for Ukraine
Paralympic bronze medalists for Ukraine
Medalists at the 2018 Winter Paralympics
Medalists at the 2022 Winter Paralympics
Paralympic medalists in biathlon
Paralympic medalists in cross-country skiing
21st-century Ukrainian women